Dana Bailey may refer to:

 Dana Reed Bailey (1833–1908), politician in Vermont, Wisconsin and South Dakota
 Dana Linn Bailey (born 1986), American fitness and figure competitor